This is a list of films released by the American studio Chesterfield Pictures between its founding in 1925 and 1937 when it was absorbed into the larger Republic Pictures. The studio was a Poverty Row producer, distributing mainly low-budget second features. In 1932 it merged with another company Invincible Pictures, and distributed films put out under that name. In total Chesterfield handled more than a hundred films during its twelve year existence.

1920s

1930s

References

Bibliography
 Michael R. Pitts. Poverty Row Studios, 1929-1940: An Illustrated History of 55 Independent Film Companies, with a Filmography for Each. McFarland & Company, 2005.

Chesterfield Pictures films
Chesterfield Pictures
Chesterfield Pictures